The 35th Metro Manila Film Festival–Philippines was held from December 25, 2009 to January 7, 2010. During this period, no other films are allowed to be screened in Philippine theaters.

Ang Panday received the Best Picture Award in the 2009 Metro Manila Film Festival. According to reports on the festival’s awards, a film's grosses represent about 40% of its merits, so it should be no surprise that Ang Panday is chosen the best film. With revenues estimated at more than P20 million (approx. US$430,000), Ramon "Bong" Revilla Jr.'s vehicle has led the Metro Manila festival's box office in its first three days. The film also earned seven other awards including the Best Actor for Revilla, Metro Manila Film Festival Award for Best Supporting Actor and Child Performer for second consecutive time winners Phillip Salvador and Buboy Villar respectively, and Best Original Theme Song for Ogie Alcasid among others.

Meanwhile, Regal Films' Mano Po 6: A Mother's Love won six awards including the Best Actress for Sharon Cuneta, Best Supporting Actress for Heart Evangelista, Best Director for Joel Lamangan and the prestigious Gatpuno Antonio J. Villegas Cultural Awards above others.

Entries
These are the 7 films in the film festival.

Awards
The awarding ceremony was held on December 28, 2009, at the SMX Convention Center, SM Mall of Asia, Pasay. The jury is composed of National Artist for Film Eddie Romero, Cinema Evaluation Board chair Christine Dayrit, Movie and Television Review and Classification Board chair Consoliza Laguardia, festival executive director Rolly Josef, film director Bebong Osorio, Film Editors Guild president Jess Navarro, film producer Simon Ongpin, composer Dero Pedero, Metropolitan Manila Development Authority AGM Planning head Cora Cruz, Manila Bulletin entertainment editor Crispina Belen and Marikina center of excellence head Julie Borje.

The criteria for judging Best Pictures are as follows:
Box office earning on the first three days (December 25–27): 50%
Artistry, creativity and technical excellence, innovativeness and global appeal: 40%
Filipino, cultural and/or historical value: 10%

{| class=wikitable
|-
! style="background:#EEDD82; width:50%" | Best Picture
! style="background:#EEDD82; width:50%" | Best Director
|-
| valign="top" |
Ang Panday - GMA Films and Imus ProductionsI Love You, Goodbye - Star Cinema 
Ang Darling Kong Aswang - OctoArts Films, M-Zet Productions and APT Entertainment 
Shake, Rattle & Roll 11 - Regal Entertainment
| valign="top" |Joel Lamangan - Mano Po 6: A Mother's Love
Rico Gutierrez, Don Michael Perez, Jessel Monteverde - Shake, Rattle & Roll 11
|-
! style="background:#EEDD82; width:50%" | Best Actor
! style="background:#EEDD82; width:50%" | Best Actress
|-
| valign="top"|
Bong Revilla - Ang Panday
Dolphy - Nobody, Nobody But... Juan
Vic Sotto - Ang Darling Kong Aswang
Gabby Concepcion - I Love You, Goodbye
Derek Ramsay - I Love You, Goodbye
Manny Pacquiao - Wapakman
| valign="top" |
Sharon Cuneta - Mano Po 6: A Mother's Love
Angelica Panganiban - I Love You, Goodbye
Cristine Reyes - Ang Darling Kong Aswang
Iza Calzado - Ang Panday
|-
! style="background:#EEDD82; width:50%" | Best Supporting Actor
! style="background:#EEDD82; width:50%" | Best Supporting Actress
|-
| valign="top"|
Phillip Salvador - Ang Panday
Eddie Garcia - Nobody, Nobody But... Juan
Jojo Alejar - Wapakman
John Lapus - Shake, Rattle & Roll 11
Dennis Trillo - Mano Po 6: A Mother's Love
Eric Quizon - Nobody, Nobody But... Juan
Jeffrey Quizon - Nobody, Nobody But... Juan
| valign="top" |
Heart Evangelista - Mano Po 6: A Mother's Love
Zsa Zsa Padilla - Mano Po 6: A Mother's Love
Heart Evangelista -Nobody, Nobody But... Juan
Kim Chiu - I Love You, Goodbye
Rhian Ramos - Ang Panday
Agot Isidro - Ang Darling Kong Aswang
|-
! style="background:#EEDD82; width:50%" | Best Cinematography
! style="background:#EEDD82; width:50%" | Best Production Design
|-
| valign="top"|
Lee Briones-Meily - I Love You, Goodbye
Juan Lorenzo - Shake, Rattle & Roll 11
| valign="top" |
Richard Somes - Ang Panday
|-
! style="background:#EEDD82; width:50%" | Best Child Performer
! style="background:#EEDD82; width:50%" | Best Editing
|-
| valign="top" |
Robert Villar  - Ang Panday
| valign="top"|
Manet Dayrit and Efren Jarlego  - I Love You, Goodbye
|-
! style="background:#EEDD82; width:50%" | Best Original Story
! style="background:#EEDD82; width:50%" | Best Screenplay
|-
| valign="top" |
Vanessa Valdez, Anna Karenina Ramos and Kriz Gazmen - I Love You, Goodbye
Gina Marie Tagasa, Elmer Gatchalian, Renato Custodio - Shake, Rattle & Roll 11
| valign="top" |
Roy Iglesias - Mano Po 6: A Mother's Love|-
! style="background:#EEDD82; width:50%" | Best Original Theme Song
! style="background:#EEDD82; width:50%" | Best Musical Score
|-
| valign="top" |Ogie Alcasid ("Tanging Ikaw Lamang" - performed by Regine Velasquez) - Ang Panday| valign="top" |
Von de Guzman - Mano Po 6: A Mother's Love
|-
! style="background:#EEDD82; width:50%" | Best Visual Effects
! style="background:#EEDD82; width:50%" | Best Make-up Artist
|-
| valign="top"|
Jay Santiago - Ang Panday
| valign="top" |
Noel Flores - Shake, Rattle & Roll 11
|-
! style="background:#EEDD82; width:50%" | Best Sound Recording
! style="background:#EEDD82; width:50%" | Best Float
|-
| valign="top" |
Mike Idioma - Ang Darling Kong Aswang
| valign="top" align=center| -
|-
! style="background:#EEDD82; width:50%" | Most Gender-Sensitive Film
! style="background:#EEDD82; width:50%" | Gatpuno Antonio J. Villegas Cultural Awards
|-
| valign="top" |'Mano Po 6: A Mother's Love  - Regal Entertainment| valign="top" |Mano Po 6: A Mother's Love  - Regal Entertainment|}

Special categories
Winners are listed first and highlighted in boldface'.

Multiple awards

Box Office gross

Cinema Evaluation BoardMano Po 6: A Mother's Love: Graded AI Love You, Goodbye: Graded BAng Darling Kong Aswang: Graded BAng Panday'': Graded B

References

External links

Metro Manila Film Festival
MMFF
MMFF
MMFF
MMFF
MMFF